Pontlottyn railway station is a railway station serving the village of Pontlottyn, south Wales. It is a stop on the Rhymney Line of the Transport for Wales network.

Service
The station generally enjoys an hourly train service to  &  (with most services extending to ), although it has additional trains in the peak hours (approximately every half-hour).

A reduced service (every two hours each way) operates on Sundays.

External links

Railway stations in Caerphilly County Borough
DfT Category F2 stations
Former Rhymney Railway stations
Railway stations in Great Britain opened in 1859
Railway stations served by Transport for Wales Rail